Nawnglun is the name of several villages in Burma:

Nawnglun, Hkamti
Nawnglun, Hsi Hseng